The 16th Asian Table Tennis Championships 2003 were held in Bangkok, Thailand, from 22 to 28 February 2003. It was organised by the Table Tennis Association of Thailand under the authority of Asian Table Tennis Union (ATTU) and International Table Tennis Federation (ITTF).

Medal summary

Medal table

Events

See also
2003 World Table Tennis Championships
Asian Cup

References

Asian Table Tennis Championships
Asian Table Tennis Championships
Table Tennis Championships
Table tennis competitions in Thailand
Asian Table Tennis Championships
Asian Table Tennis Championships